Duraykish District is a district of the Tartus Governorate in northwestern Syria. Administrative centre is the town of Duraykish. At the 2004 census, the district had a population of 60,978.

Sub-districts
The district of Duraykish (Dreikiche) is divided into four sub-districts or nawāḥī (population as of 2004):
Duraykish Subdistrict (ناحية دريكيش): population 28,749.
Junaynet Ruslan Subdistrict (ناحية جنينة رسلان): population 9,846
Hamin Subdistrict (ناحية حمين): population 8,679.
Dweir Ruslan Subdistrict (ناحية دوير رسلان): population 13,704.

References